The Original Church of God or Sanctified Church is an association of holiness Christian churches headquartered in Nashville, Tennessee. The members and clergy of the churches are predominantly African-American. The official name of the body is The Original Church of God or Sanctified Church, General Body.

History 

The church's roots are in the holiness movement. In the 1890s a group of African American Baptist ministers, led by Charles Price Jones and Charles Harrison Mason, were dismissed by the Baptist Church for preaching entire sanctification. After a number of unaffiliated revivals, a church was formed in Jackson, Mississippi, by Jones, Mason, and others. Originally called the "Church of God", it was soon renamed the "Church of God in Christ" and had affiliated churches in a number of cities. During this time an elder of the church, Charles W. Gray formed a number of Church of God in Christ churches in and around Nashville.

The Church of God in Christ split in 1907 over the issue of pentecostalism, with both factions continuing to use the name "Church of God in Christ" until 1915 when the pentecostal faction, led by Mason, incorporated under that name, Church of God in Christ. The non-pentecostal faction led by Jones began using the name Church of Christ (Holiness) U.S.A., and incorporated under that name in 1920. At the time of the 1907 schism, Gray's churches also split from the Church of God in Christ. Though they were also non-pentecostal and were doctrinally identical to Jones' faction, they were independent from Jones' body and were congregational in organization. Gray's churches were known by the name "Church of God (Sanctified Church)". In 1927 the Church of God (Sanctified Church) incorporated under the name "Church of God, or Sanctified Church" (subsequently changed to "Church of God Sanctified, Incorporated") and created a board of elders as its governing body. The new board approved the ordination of women, which Gray opposed, and in that same year Gray and a group of members broke away to form a new body, the "Original Church of God or Sanctified Church."  Both bodies still exist today.

Gray remained the leader of the church until his death in 1945, followed by William Crosby until 1952, and T.R. Jeffries.

Churches and membership 

The body includes about 63 churches. As of the 1970s it had about 5,000 members.

See also
 Original Church of God (Pulaski, Tennessee)

References

External links 
 Official Site

African-American history in Nashville, Tennessee
Holiness denominations
Historically African-American Christian denominations
Christian organizations established in 1927
Christian denominations established in the 20th century
Church of God denominations
Pentecostal denominations in North America
Pentecostalism in the United States